The A592 road is a major route running north–south through the English Lake District.

The road connects Penrith  and junction 40 of the M6 motorway), with Staveley at the southern tip of the lake, Windermere,  which is skirted by the A592 on its eastern bank; the road also follows the northern/western bank of Ullswater. It passes through Glenridding, Patterdale, the town of Windermere (where it crosses the A591 road), Bowness-on-Windermere and Storrs.

The total length is just under , including a short concurrency with the A66 road to the west of the motorway junction.

References

Roads in Cumbria